The following lists events that happened during 2015 in Algeria.

Incumbents
 President: Abdelaziz Bouteflika
 Prime Minister  : Abdelmalek Sellal

Events

January
January 8-16 – 2015 UNAF U-23 Tournament

Deaths
6 February – Assia Djebar, 78, novelist, translator and filmmaker
5 July – Abderrahmane Soukane, 78, footballer

References

 
2010s in Algeria
Years of the 21st century in Algeria
Algeria
Algeria